Zahana District is a district of Mascara Province, Algeria.

The district is further divided into 2 municipalities:
Zahana
El-Gaada

Districts of Mascara Province